Rocket in the Pocket is a 1998 electronica album released by Console. After receiving much critical acclaim, the album was re-issued in 1999, 2000 and 2002.

The song "Crabcraft", which samples Orchestral Manoeuvres in the Dark's "Sacred Heart", was used by Björk on her 2001 album Vespertine for the song "Heirloom".

Track listing
"My Dog Eats Beats" – 6:06
"14 Zero Zero" – 3:47
"Gull Galore" – 5:08
"Dolphin Dos" – 5:25
"Pigeon Party" – 4:32
"Delay Dackel" – 3:01
"Crabcraft" – 5:12
"Rocket in the Pocket" – 5:11
"Bee-Queen" – 5:29
"Walk Like a Worm" – 4:50

Critical reception

External links 
 Rocket in the Pocket on Discogs

Notes and references 

1998 albums
Console (musician) albums
Matador Records albums